The paldong is a traditional lip-valley flute of the Kalinga tribes in the Philippines.

Design 
It is an open, single end-blown flute. The lower end of the flute has three fingerholes.

The instrument is made from bamboo with its upper edge cut away obliquely from the backside and slightly from the front-side. The paldong is open at both ends, with a total of four fingerholes: three in front, and one at the back. The player's lower lip is placed against the cut away surface.

Role 
The paldong is used for serenades, courting women, for leisure and to pass the time. Melodies are mostly improvised. The song titles describe what the melody is trying to mimic, such as the chirping of a bird, the cry of an eagle, the buzz of a wasp, etc.

Instrument variations
The lip-valley flutes in the Philippines are known by different names: abalao, abellao, sinongyop (Bontoc); balding, paldong, enoppok, innupok (Kalinga); tipano, kipano, paldeng (Isneg); and taladi (Ibaloi); palendag (Maguindanao); palalu (Mansaka); Palandag (Bagobo). The lip-valley flutes from the Southern Philippines tend to be longer than those from the Northern Philippines.

See also
Palendag (a similar, less refined, end-blown bamboo flute)
Tumpong 
Tongali (Philippine nose flute)
Suling
Diwas
Gabbang
Bungkaka
Takumbo
Kolitong

References

External links
De Jager, Fekke (2005-2011). "Kipas Gallery"
. "Lip valley Flutes | MusiKoleksyon"

End-blown flutes
Philippine musical instruments
Culture of Kalinga (province)
Bamboo musical instruments